Irina Grazhdanova is a paralympic swimmer from Russia competing mainly in category S9 events.

Career 
Irina competed at both the 2004 and 2008 Summer Paralympics.  In both games she won a silver in the 50m freestyle behind South Africa's Natalie du Toit.  In 2004, she also competed in the 100m butterfly where she finished last in her heat, 200m individual medley finishing in fifth in her heat but not advancing to the final, 100m freestyle finishing seventh in the final and was part of the Russian team that missed out on bronze in the 4 × 100 m medley by 0.12 seconds.  In the 2008 games she also competed in the 100m butterfly, the 100m freestyle, 200m individual medley and the 400m freestyle but failed to make the final in any of the events.

References

External links 
 

Paralympic swimmers of Russia
Swimmers at the 2004 Summer Paralympics
Swimmers at the 2008 Summer Paralympics
Paralympic silver medalists for Russia
Russian female butterfly swimmers
Russian female freestyle swimmers
Russian female medley swimmers
Living people
Medalists at the 2004 Summer Paralympics
Medalists at the 2008 Summer Paralympics
S9-classified Paralympic swimmers
Year of birth missing (living people)
Medalists at the World Para Swimming Championships
Medalists at the World Para Swimming European Championships
Paralympic medalists in swimming
21st-century Russian women